Ghost Rider is a third-person, hack and slash game released for the PlayStation 2, PlayStation Portable, and Game Boy Advance based on the movie of the same name, released worldwide in February 2007. An Xbox version of this game was originally planned for release, but was cancelled.

The game's storyline is drawn from the movie, and was penned by Marvel writers Garth Ennis and Jimmy Palmiotti. Players can play as Ghost Rider both on foot, or on the Hellcycle. The villains are from both the movie and the comic, including  Scarecrow, Deathwatch, Lilith.

The game received mixed reviews for PlayStation 2 and Game Boy Advance and very mixed to negative reviews for PlayStation Portable.

Plot 
Mephisto tells Vengeance to bring the Ghost Rider to him. Vengeance pursues Johnny on his own Hellcycle and captures him, opening a fiery portal to Hell in midair. In a fit of rage, Johnny becomes the Rider. Eventually, he reaches the Gates of Hell. However, Mephisto appears and prevents his escape. He explains to Johnny that he is losing his grip on his demons, which are escaping Hell and rampaging on the surface and, if not stopped, could trigger the apocalypse. If his army cannot be kept under control, the Angels of Heaven have threatened to subsume Mephisto's kingdom.

To prevent it, he recruits the Rider. Johnny dismisses him, though agrees when Mephisto sends Vengeance to kill Roxanne Simpson—forcing Blaze to kill Vengeance. He travels back to Earth and proceeds to San Venganza to fight Lilith and the demon goddess' sons, along with the Dark Heart monsters, as well as the other demons who had escaped from Hell. Soon, he faces Lilith and kills her; with Johnny unaware that some of the demon goddess' sons, the Lilin, have survived and escaped with Blackheart's body. The Caretaker/Phantom Rider arrives, accompanied by the dhampir vampire-hunter Blade to help Ghost Rider. They tell the Rider that Blackout has joined forces with Deathwatch and his demons to steal military hardware. Johnny travels to and ultimately kills Blackout while Blade finds and hides Blackheart's body.

Caught off guard, Ghost Rider discovers that Roxanne has been kidnapped by Scarecrow. Having beaten him and saved Roxanne, Johnny is directed – by Scarecrow – to the carnival where his father was killed. There, he meets Mephisto, who reveals that he was against the Rider all along.

In order to summon a portal to Hell and usher in the Apocalypse (but knowing that any efforts using demons would have been thwarted by the Angels), Mephisto sent Ghost Rider on his quest so that the hellfire of his cycle would inscribe the massive geoglyph necessary to summon the portal. After the explanation, Blackheart, whose body was supposed to be hidden by Blade, manages to reawaken itself and escape to find Ghost Rider's and Mephisto's whereabouts. He immediately grows immensely powerful—though is taken down by Johnny. After which, Mephisto then disappears with Blackheart's body and Johnny reunites with Roxanne.

Gameplay
The game features a system reminiscent to that of God of War and Devil May Cry, even having some of the same controls and style of attacks. Combos are done with bare hands and with the Demonic chain. The overall mood, setting and visual style are very much the same as those in the first installment of Devil May Cry. When on the Hellcycle, Ghost Rider is still capable of performing some of the same chain attacks, and can shoot hellfire.

The Game Boy Advance version has some elements of Road Rash and Castlevania.

Alternate characters
After beating the game on certain difficulty levels, bonus character skins can be unlocked. They include Classic Ghost Rider, Ghost Rider 2099, Vengeance, and Blade the vampire hunter.

Blade
If the player chooses to start the game again as Blade, they get slightly changed gameplay. Blade (who later appeared in another Columbia/Marvel game, Spider-Man: Friend or Foe) has only his Daywalker Sword for a weapon, he does not have the shotgun or chain-link attacks of Ghost Rider. Combo attacks are much more limited. He also does not replenish health by absorbing flames from the occasional fire-drums scattered throughout the game levels. Instead, Blade can suck the life force from any wounded foe that is a non-boss (readiness is indicated by a circle above their heads). However, during the motorcycle-racing sections, his vehicle can still shoot firebolts, and he can use his sword for melee combat.

PSP racing
The PSP version has an exclusive racing circuit gameplay, which includes not just Ghost Rider and the alternate characters who are playable in storyline, but also Ghost Rider's human form Johnny Blaze, Caretaker, Lilith and Deathwatch. In this gameplay, the racer can use a power icon, which allows them to utilizes their boost, traps and alternate projectiles, similar to Nintendo's Mario Kart series. The racing circuit stage includes Daily Bugle from Spider-Man trilogy franchise.

Reception

The Game Boy Advance and PlayStation 2 versions of Ghost Rider received "mixed or average reviews", while the PSP version received "generally unfavorable reviews", according to the review aggregation website Metacritic.

References

External links
 2K Games Official Site
 
 
 
 

2007 video games
2K games
Climax Group games
Cancelled Xbox games
Hack and slash games
Video games based on Marvel Comics films
Video games based on films
Video games based on adaptations
Game Boy Advance games
Video game
PlayStation 2 games
PlayStation Portable games
Video games about demons
Video games about skeletons
Video games based on works by Mark Steven Johnson
Video games based on works by Roy Thomas
Video games developed in the United Kingdom
Video games set in Texas
Superhero video games
Take-Two Interactive games
Magic Pockets games
Single-player video games
Sony Pictures video games
RenderWare games